Jovrine Kyomukama Kaliisa (born 17 August 1975) is a Ugandan politician and a Businesswoman by profession. She is the district woman representative of Ibanda and affiliated to the National Resistance Movement political party. In 2021-2026 elections, she was the  aspiring Woman MP for Ibanda District under the National Resistance Movement political party, however she didn't win the elections.

Education background 
She attended St Helens Primary School, Nyamitanga for her Primary Leaving Examinations in 1989 and later joined Lugogo Hall Centre for Uganda Certificate Of Education in 2011. She holds Uganda Advanced Certificate of Education from Buganda College, Wakiso in 2013.

Career before politics 
From 2005 to date, she has been employed as the Director of Crane Coaches Ltd. Between 1994 and 1997, she worked as the Radio Presenter at Radio Uganda. In the year 1998–2002, she served as the Sales Manager at Sales International Uganda. From 2002 to 2005, she was working at UGAWood Construction Company as a Manager.

Political life 
From 2016 to date, Jovrine served as the Member of Parliament at Parliament of Uganda. While at the Parliament of Uganda, she served on the Committee on  HIV/AIDS & Related Disease and Committee on Public Service and Local Government. In 2020, she was arrested and detained at Ibanda Police Station on Thursday evening for flouting COVID-19 guidelines, dishing out money and campaigning past deadline. In the 10 Parliament, she was the member of the Uganda Women Parliamentary Association.

Personal details 
She is married. Her hobbies are reading and swimming and she has a special interest in community work.

See also 

 List of members of the tenth Parliament of Uganda
 Parliament of Uganda
 Member of Parliament

References

External links 

 Website of the Parliament of Uganda
Jovrine Kaliisa Kyomukama on Facebook
https://newscom.co.ug/tag/jovrine-kaliisa-kyomukama/

Living people
1975 births
National Resistance Movement politicians
Ibanda District
Members of the Parliament of Uganda
Women members of the Parliament of Uganda
21st-century Ugandan politicians
21st-century Ugandan women politicians